The Sheffield Scimitars are an ice hockey team that plays their home games at the iceSheffield in Sheffield. They play in the NIHL 2 Laidler Conference and are affiliated with the Sheffield Steeldogs of the National League. In 2020, Sheffield Academy announced their senior team would once again be known as the Sheffield Scimitars.

Season-by-season record

Club roster 2022-23
(*) Denotes a Non-British Trained player (Import)

2021/22 Outgoing

References

Ice hockey teams in the United Kingdom
Ice hockey teams in England
Sports teams and clubs in Sheffield
Ice hockey clubs established in 2010
2010 establishments in England